Terminal Bar is an American documentary short film directed by Stefan Nadelman and starring Sheldon Nadelman.

A collection of Sheldon Nadelman's Terminal Bar photos used in the film was released in book form in 2014 entitled, Terminal Bar: A Photographic Record of New York's Most Notorious Watering Hole.

Premise
The film is a fast-paced, photo-driven documentary of one of the seediest bars in Times Square, the Terminal Bar, as seen through haunting black and white photographs taken by bartender Sheldon Nadelman from 1972 to 1982.

References

External links

2003 short documentary films
2003 films
American short documentary films
Drinking establishments
Films about bartenders
Documentary films about New York City
American LGBT-related short films
Documentary films about food and drink
Times Square
2000s English-language films
2000s American films